The Munich Information Center for Protein Sequences (MIPS) was a research center hosted at the Institute for Bioinformatics (IBI) at Neuherberg, Germany with a focus on genome oriented bioinformatics, in particular on the systematic analysis of genome information including the development and application of bioinformatics methods in genome annotation, gene expression analysis and proteomics. MIPS supported and maintained a set of generic databases as well as the systematic comparative analysis of microbial, fungal, and plant genomes.

As of September 2019, the institute was closed after 18 years of service, and several of its subdivisions were reorganized to resources, both internal and external.

References

External links
 
 
 

Agricultural research institutes in Germany
Biological databases
Genetics in Germany
Genetics or genomics research institutions
Medical and health organisations based in Bavaria